Westford may refer to:

Places in the United States
Westford, Connecticut
Westford, Massachusetts
Westford, New York
Westford (CDP), New York
Westford, Vermont
Westford (CDP), Vermont
Westmore, Vermont, originally chartered as "Westford"
Westford, Wisconsin (disambiguation)

Ships
, formerly SS Empire Baxter

See also
 West Ford  (c. 1784 – 1863), caretaker and manager of Mount Vernon